Junk Mail is a 1997 Norwegian film directed by Pål Sletaune.  The film won many awards including Best Actress for Eli Anne Linnestad, Best Actor for Robert Skjærstad and Best Film for Pål Sletaune at the Amanda Awards in Norway and the Mercedes-Benz award at the Cannes Film Festival.  The film was selected as the Norwegian entry for the Best Foreign Language Film at the 70th Academy Awards, but was not accepted as a nominee.

Plot
Junk Mail tells the story of lazy, nosy postman Roy Amundsen who has a bad habit of dipping into the mail of his customers.  He takes this further when he finds the keys to the apartment of laundry assistant Line Groberg and decides to investigate her apartment.  This leads to all manner of complications when he saves her life and then discovers that she's been coerced into covering up a crime and looking after money for local gangster.

Reception
The aggregate site Rotten Tomatoes gives the film an approval rating of 93% based on 15 reviews, and an average rating of 7.43/10.

See also
 List of submissions to the 70th Academy Awards for Best Foreign Language Film
 List of Norwegian submissions for the Academy Award for Best Foreign Language Film

References

External links
 
 

1997 films
1990s Norwegian-language films
Films directed by Pål Sletaune
Norwegian crime comedy films
Norwegian thriller films